Kjer may refer to:

In people:
 Eva Kjer Hansen (born 1964), the Danish Minister for Food, Agriculture and Fisheries
 Bodil Kjer (1917–2003), a Danish actress 
 Paul Kjer, Danish ophthalmologist who first described the condition now known as Kjer's optic neuropathy

In other uses:
 Kjer's optic neuropathy, dominant optic atrophy

Danish-language surnames